Döllük

 Döllük, Mustafakemalpaşa
 Döllük, Şarkışla